The 1995 UCI Road World Championships took place in Duitama, Colombia from October 4 to October 8, 1995. It was the last world championship that had an amateur road race: in 1996 this was replaced by an event for cyclists under 23 years.

Events summary

References
Autobus.cyclingnews.com

 
UCI Road World Championships by year
World Championships
Uci Road World Championships
UCI Road World Championships
International cycle races hosted by Colombia